Kanki is a census town in the Para CD block in the Raghunathpur subdivision of the Purulia district in the state of West Bengal, India.

Geography

Location

Area overview
Purulia district forms the lowest step of the Chota Nagpur Plateau. The general scenario is undulating land with scattered hills. Raghunathpur subdivision occupies the northern part of the district. 83.80% of the population of the subdivision lives in rural areas. However, there are pockets of urbanization and 16.20% of the population lives in urban areas. There are 14 census towns in the subdivision. It is presented in the map given alongside. There is a coal mining area around Parbelia and two thermal power plants are there – the 500 MW Santaldih Thermal Power Station and the 1200 MW Raghunathpur Thermal Power Station. The subdivision has a rich heritage of old temples, some of them belonging to the 11th century or earlier. The Banda Deul is a monument of national importance. The comparatively more recent in historical terms, Panchkot Raj has interesting and intriguing remains in the area.

Note: The map alongside presents some of the notable locations in the subdivision. All places marked in the map are linked in the larger full screen map.

Demographics
According to the 2011 Census of India, Kanki had a total population of 6,884, of which 3,530 (51%) were males and 3,350 (49%) were females. There were 937 persons in the age range of 0–6 years. The total number of literate persons in Kanki was 4,402 (74.02% of the population over 6 years).

Infrastructure
According to the District Census Handbook 2011, Puruliya, Kanki covered an area of 3.8688 km2. There is a railway station at Santaldih, 4 km away. Among the civic amenities, it had 17 km roads with both open and closed drains, the protected water supply involved overhead tank, hand pump, uncovered well. It had 495 domestic electric connections. Among the medical facilities it had 1 dispensary/ health centre, 1 family welfare centre, 1 maternity and child welfare centre, 1 veterinary hospital, 4 medicine shops. Among the educational facilities it had were 1 primary school, 1 middle school, the nearest secondary school, the nearest senior secondary school, at Santaldih 2 km away, the nearest general degree college at Raghunathpur 24 km away. It had 2 non-formal education centres (Sarvya Siksha Abhiyan centres). Among the important products it manufactured were bamboo products. It had the branch of 1 nationalised bank.

Transport
The railway station at Santaldih, on the Adra-Gomoh branch line is located nearby.

Education
Santaldih College was established in 2008 at Usir, PO Chatarmahul.

Chakbad High School is a Bengali-medium coeducational institution established in 1951. It has facilities for teaching from class V to class XII.

Kanki Junior High School is a Bengali-medium coeducational institution established in 2008. It has facilities for teaching from class V to class VIII.

Culture
Banda Deul, located nearby, an 11th-century temple, is a monument of national importance.

There are 3 dilapidated deuls at Para belonging to the 10th-11th century.

Healthcare
Para Block Primary Health Centre, with 30 beds, at Para is a major government medical facility in the Para CD block.

References

Cities and towns in Purulia district